I Walk the Line is a soundtrack album to a 1970 film of the same name starring Gregory Peck. Released that same year on Columbia Records, it is, in essence, a country album by Johnny Cash (his 36th), as the entire soundtrack is composed solely of Cash songs, including a rearranged version of the famous title song. Also included is "Flesh and Blood", a ballad written by Cash which reached the top of the Country charts.
The album was released on CD in 1999 backed with the soundtrack Little Fauss and Big Halsy [Bear Family Records 4000127161307]. The Bear Family release features an alternate longer version of the title song.

Track listing
All songs written by Johnny Cash except where noted.

*This is the running abbreviated time on the original Columbia Vinyl release. The full version timed at 3:29 was released on the Bear Family CD I Walk The Line/Little Fauss And Big Halsy

Personnel 
 Johnny Cash – vocals, guitar
 Marshall Grant – bass guitar
 WS Holland – drums
 Bob Wootton – electric guitar
 The Carter Family – background vocals

Charts
Album – Billboard (United States)

Singles – Billboard (United States)

External links

 Luma Electronic entry on I Walk the Line

Drama film soundtracks
Albums produced by Bob Johnston
1970 soundtrack albums
Johnny Cash soundtracks
Columbia Records soundtracks
Bear Family Records albums